Micromeryx is an extinct genus of musk deer that lived during the Miocene epoch (about 16-8 million years ago). Fossil remains were found in Europe and Asia. The earliest record (MN4) of the genus comes from the Sibnica 4 paleontological site near Rekovac in Serbia.

Characteristics
This animal was very similar to the modern musk deer (Moschus moschiferus) of East Asia. However, Micromeryx (its name means "tiny ruminant") was much smaller: it perhaps reached 5 kilograms. Teeth were very similar to those of the extant Cephalophus but more primitive. Like in the present moschids, the males of these animals were equipped with long upper canines, protruding from the mouth when it was closed. The body was slender and short, while the legs were extremely elongated.

Systematics
Micromeryx was a primitive representative of the moschids, a group of primitive ruminants related to deer and cattle. They had a remarkable expansion during the Miocene and Pliocene and are currently represented by a few species, such as the aforementioned Moschus moschiferus. Micromeryx probably originated in Western Asia and then spread to Europe and East Asia. Many fossils of this animal have been found in a vast geographical area ranging from Anatolia (Turkey) to Spain and China. A somewhat similar animal was Hispanomeryx, which lived in about the same area but went extinct during the middle Miocene.

References

Further reading
 Sánchez, I. M., and J. Morales. 2006. Distributión biocronológica de los Moschidae (Mammalia; Ruminantia) en España. Estudios Geológicos 62:533–546.

Prehistoric musk deer
Prehistoric even-toed ungulate genera
Fossils of Serbia